Masoom may refer to:
Masoom (1941 film), Bollywood film
Masoom (1960 film), Indian film by Satyen Bose
Masoom (1983 film), Indian film by Shekhar Kapur
Masoom (1996 film), Indian film by Mahesh Kothare
Masoom (2014 film)

People with the name
Rahi Masoom Raza (1927–1992), Urdu poet
Mir Masoom Ali (born 1937), Bangladeshi-American statistician
Mohammed Masoom Stanekzai (born 1958), Defense Minister of Afghanistan
Munnawar Masoom, Indian singer of qawwali